Wings Over the Pacific is a 60-minute 1943 drama film, directed by Phil Rosen and starring Inez Cooper, Edward Norris and Montagu Love. Produced by Monogram Pictures, the film depicts an island community in the South Pacific caught up in World War II.

Plot
In 1943, World War I veteran Jim Butler (Montagu Love), along with his daughter Nona (Inez Cooper) and their English servant and friend, Harry Adams (Ernie Adams), live on Sunday Island, a small island in the South Pacific. Their idyllic life is shattered when an air battle takes place over the island. One pilot bails out of his damaged aircraft while the other pilot manages to land.

A German pilot, Lt. Kurt Heiman (Henry Guttman) finds that the American pilot Allan Scott (Edward Norris) is unconscious, but before he is killed, Mona entreats Helman to bring the wounded American to her home. Butler is afraid that either pilot will contact their superiors about the valuable oil deposits on the island, so he takes control of the situation, confiscating the German's pistol and insisting that both antagonists agree to a truce.

Helman has a secret ally on the island, Captain Van Bronck (Robert Armstrong) and together, the two make plans to have Japanese invaders to take over the island. An uneasy alliance of Butler and the American pilot is needed to beat back the attack, but ultimately, the islanders and their friends are able to summon help from the Americans. Mona and Scott declare their love and prepare for a life together.

Cast

 Inez Cooper as Nona Butler
 Edward Norris as Lt. Allan Scott (USN)
 Montagu Love as Jim Butler
 Robert Armstrong as Captain Pieter Van Bronck
 Henry Guttman as Lt. Kurt Heiman
 Ernie Adams as Harry Adams
 Satini Puailoa as Chief
 John Roth as Taro
 Alex Havier as Japanese officer
 George Kamel as Native
 Jody Gilbert as Large female native
 James Lono as Native
 Hawksha Paia as Native
 Josephine as Josephine the bear

Production

Principal photography on Wings Over the Pacific began on March 5, 1943 and continued until late-March. The location photography for Sunday Island was at the Monogram Pictures backlot. Monogram Pictures operated the Monogram Ranch, its movie ranch in Placerita Canyon near Newhall, California, in the northern San Gabriel Mountains foothills.

The aircraft in Wings Over the Pacific included  the use of a Curtiss P-40 as a United States Navy (USN) fighter, although it was a replica and the only flying scenes used miniatures.

The Capelis XC-12, a failed 1933 airliner design that most notably was used as a prop, was featured in Wings Over the Pacific as a Japanese transport. The aircraft was bought by RKO in March 1939 and was used in a number of films during World War II, when flyable aircraft were unavailable. Previously, the XC-12 had appeared in Five Came Back (1939) with Chester Morris and Lucille Ball,  The Flying Tigers (1942), starring John Wayne, and Immortal Sergeant (1943) with Henry Fonda, Thomas Mitchell and Maureen O'Hara.

Reception
Wings Over the Pacific had a New York premiere, opening on the week of June 15, 1943. The film was seen as a primarily a B film programmer, typical of many of the propaganda films of the era. Aviation film historian Stephen Pendo, however, characterized the film as "... (a) poor Monogram production".

References

Notes

Citations

Bibliography

 Farmer, James H. Celluloid Wings: The Impact of Movies on Aviation. Blue Ridge Summit, Pennsylvania: Tab Books Inc., 1984. .
 Hughes, Howard. When Eagles Dared: The Filmgoers' History of World War II. London: I. B. Tauris, 2012. .
 Koppes, Clayton R. and Gregory D. Black. Hollywood Goes to War: How Politics, Profits and Propaganda Shaped World War II Movies. New York, The Free Press, 1987. .
 Orriss, Bruce. When Hollywood Ruled the Skies: The Aviation Film Classics of World War II. Hawthorne, California: Aero Associates Inc., 1984. .
 Pendo, Stephen. Aviation in the Cinema. Lanham, Maryland: Scarecrow Press, 1985. .

External links
 
 }

American aviation films
1943 films
World War II films made in wartime
Monogram Pictures films
American war drama films
1940s war drama films
American black-and-white films
1943 drama films
Films directed by Phil Rosen
Pacific War films
1940s English-language films